The Bouyon is a river that flows through the Alpes-Maritimes department of southeastern France. It flows into the river Estéron near the village Bouyon.

References

Rivers of France
Rivers of Alpes-Maritimes
Rivers of Provence-Alpes-Côte d'Azur